Frédérique Turgeon (born March 25, 1999) is a Canadian para-alpine skier.

Career
She won gold at the 2015 Canada Winter Games and silver and bronze twice at the 2019 World Para Alpine Skiing Championships. She also represented Canada at the 2018 Winter Paralympics and finished ninth in the giant slalom.

She was born with congenital femoral deficiency resulting in one of her legs being 50% shorter than the other. She broke her leg during a crash in December 2013. After the crash she stopped competing on both legs and now competes on one leg.

References

External links
 
 

1999 births
Living people
Paralympic alpine skiers of Canada
Alpine skiers at the 2018 Winter Paralympics
Skiers from Montreal
21st-century Canadian women